Offenbach is a Kreis (district) in the south of Hesse, Germany and is part of the Frankfurt/Rhine-Main Metropolitan Region. Neighbouring districts are Main-Kinzig, Aschaffenburg, Darmstadt-Dieburg, Groß-Gerau  and the cities of Darmstadt, Frankfurt and Offenbach.

History

The district Offenbach was first formed in 1832 when the previous Landratsbezirke Langen (partially), Seligenstadt and Offenbach were merged. In 1852 the district area was enlarged in a westerly direction, while some of the southern part was moved into the district of Dieburg. In 1938 the area of the Frankfurt airport was added to the district, and the city Offenbach left the district to become a district-free city. However the seat of administration stayed in Offenbach.

After two minor changes in 1942 and 1974, in 1977 the district was given its current borders, and also the municipalities in the district were merged to 10 cities and 3 municipalities. In 2002, the capital of the district was moved from Offenbach to Dietzenbach.

Geography

A large part of this very urbanised district is wooded. Most towns are part of the Frankfurt urban area. The river Main is a part of the northern border of the district.

Economy
In 2015 (latest data available) the GDP per inhabitant was €38,469. This places the district 8th out of 26 districts (rural and urban) in Hesse(overall average: €42,732).

Coat of arms
The oak tree in the coat of arms symbolize the formerly big oak forests of Dreieich (three oaks). The escutcheon in the middle shows a combination of the coat of arms of the Counts of Isenburg in the left and the Wheel of Mainz in the right, as the districts area belonged to these two counties in the past.

Towns and municipalities

References

External links

Official website (German)

 
Districts of Hesse